was a Japanese samurai of the Sengoku period who served the Date clan. Motonobu had supposedly taken up residence at a Buddhist temple during his adult life, and from that point he managed to secure a retainer position under Nakano Munetoki. Motonobu committed suicide after the death of Date Terumune.

In fiction
In NHK's 1987 Taiga drama Dokuganryū Masamune, Motonobu was played by Shigeru Kōyama.

References

Samurai
1532 births
1585 deaths
Suicides by seppuku
Date retainers
16th-century suicides